In molecular biology, MvirDB is a publicly available database that stores information on toxins, virulence factors and antibiotic resistance genes. Sources that this database uses for DNA and protein information include: Tox-Prot, SCORPION, the PRINTS Virulence Factors, VFDB, TVFac, Islander, ARGO and VIDA. The database provides a BLAST tool that allows the user to query their sequence against all DNA and protein sequences in MvirDB. Information on virulence factors can be obtained from the usage of the provided browser tool. Once the browser tool is used, the results are returned as a readable table that is organized by ascending E-Values, each of which are hyperlinked to their related page. MvirDB is implemented in an Oracle 10g relational database.

See also 

 Antimicrobial Resistance databases

References 

Antimicrobial resistance organizations
Biological databases